Francisco José de Serra e Moura  (born 3 June 1898, date of death unknown) was a Portuguese footballer who played as a midfielder. He was part of Portugal's squad for the 1928 Summer Olympics, but he did not play in any matches.

References

External links 
 
 

Portuguese footballers
Association football midfielders
Sporting CP footballers
Portugal international footballers
1898 births
Footballers from Lisbon